Bernhard Cullmann, (born 1 November 1949), nicknamed "Bernd", is a German former footballer who played as a midfielder and sometimes as a defender.

He began his footballing career in 1969 with SpVgg Porz, until he was signed by 1. FC Köln in 1970. He played 341 matches in the Bundesliga for them before his retirement on health grounds in 1984. He played 40 matches for the Germany national team between 1973 and 1980, scoring six goals. He participated at the 1974 FIFA World Cup, the 1978 FIFA World Cup, and the victorious UEFA Euro 1980. Between 1991 and 1996 he was on the board of 1. FC Köln. 

From 1996 until 2011, his son Carsten Cullmann has also played for 1. FC Köln's first and reserve teams.

Honours
1. FC Köln
 Bundesliga: 1977–78
 DFB-Pokal: 1976–77, 1977–78, 1982–83

West Germany
 World Cup: 1974
 European Championship: 1980

References

External links
 
 
 

1949 births
Living people
People from Birkenfeld (district)
Footballers from Rhineland-Palatinate
German footballers
Germany international footballers
Germany under-21 international footballers
Germany B international footballers
Association football midfielders
German football managers
1974 FIFA World Cup players
1978 FIFA World Cup players
FIFA World Cup-winning players
UEFA Euro 1980 players
UEFA European Championship-winning players
1. FC Köln players
1. FC Köln II players
Bundesliga players
West German footballers